Welcome to the Infant Freebase is the debut album by the Swedish rock band The Soundtrack of Our Lives.

The album was originally conceived as a double album, but their record company disagreed.

It includes the singles "Instant Repeater '99", "Blow My Cool", "Mantra Slider", and "Firmament Vacation (A Soundtrack of Our Lives)", and the song "Instant Repeater '99" was used for the closing credits of the movie Spun.

The vinyl release of this record also includes the tracks from the Homo Habilis Blues EP.

Track listing

Personnel
Åke Karl Kalle Gustafsson – bass, backing vocals
Martin Hederos – piano, organ, backing vocals
Ebbot Lundberg – lead vocals
Björn Olsson – guitar, backing vocals
Ian Person – guitar, backing vocals
Fredrik Sandsten – drums, percussion

Additional personnel
Peter Lundberg – pipes on "Mantra Slider" and "Magic Muslims"
Annika Modigh – backing vocals on "Bendover Babies"
Julia Larsson – tambourine on "Magic Muslims"
Marcus Westerlind – backing vocals on "Blow My Cool"

References

1996 debut albums
The Soundtrack of Our Lives albums